Warrenby is a depopulated area of Redcar in the borough of Redcar and Cleveland, ceremonial county of North Yorkshire, England. It is a light industrial area, no longer residential.

On the edge of Coatham Marsh, the area was originally called Warrenstown when it was founded in 1873 to provide housing for workers at the nearby ironworks of Downey & Co and Walker Maynard. 

In the Warrenby Disaster of 1895, eleven men, many from the village of Warrenby were killed in a massive boiler explosion at the works.

Although it was on the route of the Middlesbrough & Redcar Railway, the area did not have a station until 1916 when  was opened mainly to serve the nearby Dorman Long works. The halt closed in 1978 when the railway was realigned to make way for the new Redcar steel plant.

References

External links 

Redcar and Cleveland
Places in the Tees Valley
Villages in North Yorkshire
Former populated places in North Yorkshire